Matti Kuparinen (born October 16, 1984) is a Finnish professional ice hockey forward who currently plays for HIFK of the Finnish SM-liiga.

Kuparinen played originally with SM-liiga team, Ässät Pori, for eight seasons from 2003 to 2011, of which he was team captain for over three years. Kuparinen played his first games in SM-liiga in the season of 2003-04 and his first national team games in September 2008. He switched to KalPa in the 2011-12 season with a two-year contract that was then extended to 2015.

After a spending the majority of the 2012-13 season, abroad in the Kontinental Hockey League with Avangard Omsk, Kuparinen returned as a free agent to join his third SM-liiga club, HIFK, on an optional two-year contract on July 22, 2013.

References

External links

1984 births
Living people
Ässät players
Avangard Omsk players
KalPa players
HIFK (ice hockey) players
Finnish ice hockey forwards
Sportspeople from Pori